is a city located in Mie Prefecture, Japan. , the city had an estimated population of 16,910 in 9177 households and a population density of 88 persons per km2.

Geography
Owase is located in southeastern Kii Peninsula, in southern Mie Prefecture, facing the Gulf of Kumano the Pacific Ocean. Ninety percent of the city area is forested or coastal rias. Sandwiched between mountains and the offshore Kuroshio Current, the area is noted for very heavy rainfall from spring through autumn. More than 80% of the population is concentrated in former Osawe town, on the coast.

Neighboring municipalities
Mie Prefecture
Kumano
Kihoku
Nara Prefecture
Kamikitayama

Climate
Owase has a humid subtropical climate (Köppen climate classification Cfa), with comfortable spring and autumn seasons, and warm winters with practically no snow. Only certain parts of southern Chile, coastal British Columbia and the Adriatic Sea coast have as much rain at low elevations outside the tropics. In addition, typhoons often pass Owase in summer.

Despite the excessive wetness of the climate, summers are no more uncomfortable or humid than in the rest of southern Japan: indeed humidity is marginally lower than on cities close to the Seto Inland Sea or on the southern Sea of Japan.

Demographics
Per Japanese census data, the population of Owase has decreased steadily over the past 40 years.

History
The area of present-day Owase was part of ancient Shima Province, but was transferred to Kii Province in 1582. During this time, large-scale forestry projects were begun.  After the Meiji restoration, the area became part of Mie Prefecture. The town of Owase  was established on April 1, 1889, within Kitamuro District of Mie Prefecture with the creation of the modern municipalities system.

The city of Owase was established on June 20, 1954, by the merger of the town of Owase with the surrounding villages of Sugari and Kuki and the villages of Kitawauchi and Minamiwauchi (both from Minamimuro District).

Government
Owase has a mayor-council form of government with a directly elected mayor and a unicameral city council of 10 members. Owase, collectively with the towns of Kihoku, contributes two members to the Mie Prefectural Assembly. In terms of national politics, the city is part of Mie 4th district of the lower house of the Diet of Japan.

Economy
Due to its location, Owase is mainly supported by its commercial fishery and forestry industries. Yellowtail, amberjack, Japanese horse mackerel, sauries, sea bream and bonito are among the fish landed at Owase. Japanese cypress and cryptomeria trees are found in abundance here in the mountains.

Education
Owase has five public elementary schools and two public middle schools operated by the city government and one public high school operated by the Mie Prefectural Department of Education. The prefecture also operates one special education school for the handicapped..

Transportation

Railway
 JR Tōkai – Kisei Main Line
 -  -  -  -

Highway
 Kisei Expressway

Port
Owase Port

Local attractions 
 - Sengoku period Japanese castle site, now a park.
 - a popular hiking trails on the Kumano Kodo - Ise-ji Route. There is a hiking trail which leads to Mt. Tengura, overlooking Owase City. For more information, visit 
 Kumano Kodo Centre - Constructed entirely from cypress wood, the Kumano Kodo Centre features the origins and history of the Kumano Kodo pilgrimage route. A playground, also made entirely from cypress, is located near the centre.
 Yume Kodo - an onsen located near the Kumano Kodo Centre. The facility features deep sea water onsen, which has healing properties, as well as sauna rooms.
 - a Shinto shrine noted for an ancient, sacred tree over 1,000 years old and as the venue for the annual Ya Ya Matsuri.
 - Buddhist temple built during the Edo period with two fierce-looking deity statues guarding the entrance. It is located just adjacent to the Owase Jinja.
 - A beautiful white sandy beach, with clear turquoise waters located near the  train station.
 - a fishing village located in eastern Owase, best accessed by a 20-minute ferry ride from Owase
 - a fishing village

Festivals & Events
 – farmers market held the first Saturday morning of every month,  featuring stalls selling Owase's local produce such as fresh seafood, dried fish, sea salt, jam etc. along with special performances by the locals.
 – the largest festival in Owase, held annually on 1–5 February. In the evenings of 2-4 February, men parade around the streets, jostling each other and chanting "Ya Ya" while drinking sake before the "chosen" ones dive into the sea to purify themselves. The festival ends off with a day-long street parade on the 5th featuring dance performances and an archery contest at Owase Jinja.
 – a summer festival held on the first Saturday in August with a fireworks display.
 – held on 15 September annually, beginning with a day-long parade culminating at the local Hachiman Jinja

Sister city relations
 – Prince Rupert, British Columbia, Canada, since September 26, 1968
 – Jinzhou District, Dalian, Liaoning, China, since July 8, 2007

Notable people
Hideo Fukuyama, professional race car driver

References

External links

 
Owase sightseeing page 

Cities in Mie Prefecture
Port settlements in Japan
Populated coastal places in Japan
Owase, Mie